Arthur Davies Stadium is a multi-use stadium in Kitwe, Zambia, named after Arthur Walter Davies who was a FIFA-accredited referee and active member of the Zambian FA. Whilst General Manager of the Copperbelt Power Corporation (now the Copperbelt Energy Corporation) which was based in Kitwe, he established the Power Dynamos F.C. and the stadium.

The current stadium no longer meets FIFA standards and therefore is being rebuilt. The new stadium will seat 15,500 people, with about 20% of the seats being in the grandstand and the rest in open wings. The new stadium has been redesigned by Vela VKE's Zambian office in Kitwe. 

The stadium has an eight-lane running track and incorporates a main front building which houses a presidential suite, a large conference room, offices, a gymnasium, a clinic, physiotherapy room, a police post and a club-house.

External links
 Stadium information 
 Zambia Stadiums information
 Arthur Davies Stadium Rebuilding

Kitwe
Football venues in Zambia
Buildings and structures in Copperbelt Province